Famous Last Words is the second full-length album by Hedley released on October 30, 2007, in Canada. It debuted at number three in Canada upon release. In the United States, the album is known as Never Too Late and only includes 8 tracks from the Canadian release and contains 5 tracks from Hedley, which replace the missing tracks from Famous Last Words. Unlike Famous Last Words, Never Too Late has a blue background on its album cover, whereas the Canadian release has a red background on its cover.

Singles
The first single and first track from the album, "She's So Sorry", was released to radio on August 21, 2007. The video was shot in Toronto, Ontario on August 30 and premiered on MuchMusic on September 20, 2007. The second single and eighth track, "For the Nights I Can't Remember", was released in November 2007. It peaked at number six on the Canadian Hot 100. The third single and twelfth track,"Never Too Late", was released in April 2008, and peaked at number four on the Canadian Hot 100. The fourth single and sixth track, "Old School", released in August 2008, reached number 43 on the Canadian Hot 100 before it was officially released and went on to peak at number 10.

Critical reception

Famous Last Words was received with mixed to low reviews. Andrew Leahey of AllMusic gave the album a 2.5/5 star rating. He said, "Famous Last Words delivers the same kick of Hedley's innumerable pop-punk colleagues, relying on a blend of snot-nosed vocals and guitar muscle that evokes the likes of SR-71 and Hot Topic in the same breath. He ends off stating, "Famous Last Words does sound destined for airplay as a result, proving that Jacob Hoggard knows how to stay in the spotlight better than he knows how to craft original music. Nick of Tunelab.com gave the album a 5/10 star rating. He states, "If you are familiar with Hedley’s sound, then their often times hard to take seriously and borderline sugarcoated approach shouldn’t come as a shock."

Track listing

Never Too Late (USA Release)

Personnel
Adapted from the Famous Last Words booklet.

Hedley
Jacob Hoggard – Vocals and piano
Tommy Mac – Bass and backing vocals
Dave Rosin – Guitar and backing vocals
Chris Crippin – Drums and backing vocals

Additional musicians
Brian Howes – Guitar solo (on "She's So Sorry")
Greig Nori – Guitar solo (on "Brave New World")
Ray Garraway – Drums (on "Never Too Late")
Gillian Mott (Violin), Joshua Belvedere (Violin), Bernard Kane (Viola), Alexandra Sia (Cello) – Strings (on "Old School" and "Dying to Live Again")
Sal Ferreres – Percussion
Dave Genn – Guitars, string arrangements, piano, keyboards, additional production
Ben Kaplan – Additional keyboards
Elaine Shepherd, April White, Carly "Charly" Campbell – Back-up singers

Production
Mike Fraser – Mixing
Dean Maher – Engineering
Brian Gardner – Mastering (Bernie Grundman Mastering; Los Angeles)
Alex Aligizakis – Additional recording
Dave Ottoson – Pre-Pro recording, mixing
Shawn O'Hara – Assistant engineer (Rock Beach Recording)
Brendon Brown, Brock McFarlane, Chris Michael – Assistant engineers (Hipposonic Studios)
Eric Mosher – Assistant engineer (Warehouse Studios)

Artwork
Garnet Armstrong – Art direction, design
Matt Barnes – Photography
Simon Paul – Design
Steve McArdle – 3D illustration

Charts and certifications

Weekly charts

Certifications

References

2007 albums
Albums recorded at Hipposonic Studios
Albums recorded at The Warehouse Studio
Hedley (band) albums
Universal Music Canada albums